The Astrakhan Governorate was an Imperial, Republican, and Soviet Russian administrative division, which existed from 1717 – 1929. Created from separating the southwestern part of the Kazan Governorate, by Peter I's Reform in 1717. And abolished by the Bolshevik's administrative reform in 1928, where the governorate became part of Lower Volga Oblast (later Lower Volga Krai). The administrative center of the governorate is Astrakhan.

Geography

Geographical position 
The Astrakhan Governorate was located in the southeast of the European part of the Russian Empire, between 45° and 51° north latitude and 43° and 51° east longitude.

Location of the Governorate concerning modern administrative boundaries 
On the territory of the former Astrakhan Governorate (within the borders of 1914), currently, the Astrakhan Oblast and the Republic of Kalmykia, are completely located, partly the Volgograd Oblast, the Stavropol Krai, the Rostov Oblast, and the Republic of Dagestan; part of the Governorate became part of Kazakh–Guryev Oblast.

The northeastern part of the former Astrakhansky uyezd is located on the territory of the modern Astrakhan Oblast; in addition, the southern part of the Republic of Kalmykia is located on the territory of the uyezd, a small western part of the uyezd is located on the territory of the Rostov Oblast, a small southern part of the uyezd is located on the territory of the Stavropol Krai, and the Republic of Dagestan.

The former Krasnoyarsky uyezd is mostly located in the territory of the modern Astrakhan Oblast; its small northern part is located in the territory of Kazakhstan; the northeastern part of the former Yenotayevsky uyezd is located in the territory of the modern Astrakhan Oblast, the southwestern part constitutes the northern part of the Republic of Kalmykia, and the extreme western part is on the territory of the Rostov Oblast. The northeastern part of the former Chernoyarsky uyezd is located on the territory of the modern Astrakhan Oblast; the northern and northwestern parts are on the territory of the Volgograd Oblast, and the southern part of the uyezd is now on the northern part of the Republic of Kalmykia.

The former Tsarevsky uyezd belongs to the modern Astrakhan Oblast in a small southern part, the rest of it with the city (now the selo) of Tsarev is located on the territory of the Volgograd Oblast, and the former Kyrgyz steppe is located on the territory of modern Kazakhstan.

Area 

This territory includes the area from the city of Tsaritsyn to the Caspian Sea, between the Volga, and Akhtuba rivers, and islands along the sea coast. In terms of area, the governorate occupied the fourth largest place among other governorates of the European part of the Russian Empire.

Relief 
The territory of the governorate, as in our period, was vast, devoid of forest vegetation, sandy-clayed, and solonetsous steppe, which has a blanket-shaped slope to the southeast and is a part of the Caspian Depression, which was previously the seabed.

See also 
 Astrakhan Oblast

Note

Further reading

References

 
Governorates of the Russian Empire